Thames Street may refer to:

Thames Street, London, England
Thames Street, Oxford, England
Thames Street, Rhode Island, USA